Bowstring Truss Bridge, also known as the Roaring Run Bowstring Truss Bridge and King Tubular Arch Truss Bridge, is a historic bowstring truss bridge located at the Ironto Rest Area near Ironto, Montgomery County, Virginia. It was built by the King Bridge Company in 1878, and is a single-span, four-panel tubular arch pony truss. The bridge was partially disassembled and moved from its original location to a second site during the 1930s, where it remained until moved to its current location in 1977.

The bridge was documented by the Historic American Engineering Record in 1983 and listed on the National Register of Historic Places in 2013.

See also
List of bridges documented by the Historic American Engineering Record in Virginia
List of bridges on the National Register of Historic Places in Virginia

References

External links

Road bridges on the National Register of Historic Places in Virginia
Bridges completed in 1878
Buildings and structures in Montgomery County, Virginia
Historic American Engineering Record in Virginia
National Register of Historic Places in Montgomery County, Virginia
Bowstring truss bridges in the United States